The vice president of the Dominican Republic is the second-highest political position in the Dominican Republic. The vice president is the first person in the presidential line of succession, ascending to the presidency upon the death, resignation, or removal of the president. There have been thirty-nine vice presidents of the Dominican Republic. Under the Constitution of the Dominican Republic, the vice president shall be elected along with the president.

Since the independence of the Dominican Republic in 1844 until 1865, what is considered the First Republic, there were no constitutional vice presidents. Yet, during that time there were acting vice presidents; this was under the rule of Pedro Santana.

History
After the inception of the Dominican Republic, the country was run by a Central Governing Junta led by Pedro Santana. As such, there was no need for a vice president at the time. Yet, it is believed that the first vice president of the republic was Felipe Benicio Alfau Bustamante, who was elected as acting vice president by Pedro Santana. This was spurred because Santana was invited to go abroad yet the republic had to be seen to in his absence.

The Constitution of the Dominican Republic has been amended many times, and in some instances the office of the vice president had been eliminated to later be recreated. In times when the office was eliminated, if the president was leaving the country, an acting president was designated, therefore creating the post of a second in command. For example the 30th president of the Dominican Republic, Carlos Felipe Morales, elected Ramón Cáceres to be his vice president from 1903 until 1905. Then from 1905 to 1911, the previous vice president, Ramón Cáceres is elected as president and the office of the vice president is eliminated during that time span.

Also during the 31 year dictatorship of Rafael Trujillo, the office of the vice president was eliminated or vacated on several occasions.

Since 1966, which is considered the beginning of the 4th Republic, the office of the vice president of the Dominican Republic has been a permanent post. Also, the vice president has to be elected along with the president, not appointed by the latter.

List of vice presidents of the Dominican Republic, 1844–1861

Annexation by Spain 1861–1865 and Dominican Restoration War 1863–1865

List of vice presidents of the Dominican Republic, 1865–1924

List of vice presidents of the Dominican Republic, 1924–1965

List of vice presidents of the Dominican Republic, 1966–present

See also
 List of current vice presidents

References and Notes

 
Vice Presidents
Dominican Republic